is a former Japanese football player and manager. He is current manager of Tokyo Verdy. His younger brother Atsushi Nagai is also a former footballer.

Playing career
Nagai was born in Kagoshima Prefecture on 26 January 1971. After dropped out from Kokushikan University, he joined Verdy Kawasaki (later Tokyo Verdy) in 1992. Although he played many matches as offensive midfielder and the club won the champions 1993, 1994 J1 League, 1992, 1993 and 1994 J.League Cup, he could not become a regular behind Ruy Ramos, Tsuyoshi Kitazawa and Bismarck. In 1995, he moved to Japan Football League club Fukuoka Blux. The club won the champions in 1995 and was promoted to J1 League. In 1996, he moved to Shimizu S-Pulse. He played as regular player and the club won the champions 1996 J.League Cup their first title. He returned to Verdy in 1997 and he moved to Yokohama Flügels in 1998. He played as central player and the club won the champions 1998 Emperor's Cup. However the club was disbanded end of 1998 season due to financial strain, he moved to Yokohama F. Marinos in 1999. 

In 2000, he returned to Verdy and played 2002. After a year's blank, he joined Oita Trinita in 2004. However he could hardly play in the match. In 2005, he moved to Regional Leagues club FC Ryukyu. The club was promoted to Japan Football League (JFL) end of 2005 season. In 2006, he returned to Verdy and he played many matches as substitutes. In 2008, he moved to FC Ryukyu again. In 2014, he returned to Verdy. In November 2016, he announced his retirement end of 2016 season at the age of 45.

Coaching career
After the retirement, Nagai started coaching career at Tokyo Verdy in 2017. He served as a manager for youth team from 2017. In July 2019, he became a manager for top team as Gary White successor.

Club statistics

Managerial statistics
Update; 31 December 2020

References

External links

1971 births
Living people
Kokushikan University alumni
Association football people from Kagoshima Prefecture
Japanese footballers
J1 League players
J2 League players
Japan Football League (1992–1998) players
Japan Football League players
Tokyo Verdy players
Avispa Fukuoka players
Shimizu S-Pulse players
Yokohama Flügels players
Yokohama F. Marinos players
Oita Trinita players
FC Ryukyu players
Japanese football managers
J2 League managers
Tokyo Verdy managers
Association football midfielders